A Geissler tube is an early gas discharge tube used to demonstrate the principles of electrical glow discharge, similar to modern neon lighting. The tube was invented by the German physicist and glassblower Heinrich Geissler in 1857.  It consists of a sealed, partially evacuated glass cylinder of various shapes with a metal electrode at each end, containing rarefied gasses such as neon, argon, or air; mercury vapor or other conductive fluids; or ionizable minerals or metals, such as sodium. When a high voltage is applied between the electrodes, an electrical current flows through the tube. The current dissociates electrons from the gas molecules, creating ions, and when the electrons recombine with the ions, the gas emits light by fluorescence. The color of light emitted is characteristic of the material within the tube, and many different colors and lighting effects can be achieved.  The first gas-discharge lamps, Geissler tubes were novelty items, made in many artistic shapes and colors to demonstrate the new science of electricity.  In the early 20th century, the technology was commercialized and evolved into neon lighting.

Application

Geissler tubes were mass-produced from the 1880s as novelty and entertainment devices, with various spherical chambers and decorative serpentine paths formed into the glass tube. Some tubes were very elaborate and complex in shape and would contain chambers within an outer casing.  A novel effect could be obtained by spinning a glowing tube at high speed with a motor; a disk of color was seen due to persistence of vision.  When an operating tube was touched by the hand, the shape of the glowing discharge inside often changed due to the capacitance of the body. 

Simple straight Geissler tubes were used in early-20th-century scientific research as high voltage indicators.  When a Geissler tube was brought near a source of high voltage, alternating current, such as a Tesla coil or Ruhmkorff coil, it would light up even without contact with the circuit.  They were used to tune the tank circuits of radio transmitters to resonance.    Another example of their use was to find nodes of standing waves on transmission lines, such as Lecher lines used to measure the frequency of early radio transmitters.  

Another use around 1900 was as the light source in Pulfrich refractometers.

Geissler tubes are sometimes still used in physics education to demonstrate the principles of gas discharge tubes.

Influence
Geissler tubes were the first gas discharge tubes, and have had a large impact on the development of many instruments and devices which depend on electric discharge through gases.

One of the most significant consequences of Geissler tube technology was the discovery of the electron and the invention of electronic vacuum tubes.  By the 1870s better vacuum pumps enabled scientists to evacuate Geissler tubes to a higher vacuum; these were called Crookes tubes after William Crookes.  When current was applied, it was found that the glass envelope of these tubes would glow at the end opposite to the cathode.  Observing that sharp-edged shadows were cast on the glowing tube wall by obstructions in the tube in front of the cathode, Johann Hittorf realized that the glow was caused by some type of ray travelling in straight lines through the tube from the cathode.  These were named cathode rays.  In 1897 J. J. Thomson showed that cathode rays consisted of a previously unknown particle, which was named the electron.  The technology of controlling electron beams resulted in the invention of the amplifying vacuum tube in 1907, which created the field of electronics and dominated it for 50 years, and the cathode ray tube which was used in radar and television displays.

Some of the devices which evolved from Geissler tube technology:
Vacuum tubes
Xenon flash lamps (for flash photography)
Xenon arc lamps (for movie and IMAX projectors)
X-ray tubes
Sodium vapor lamps used in streetlights
"Neon" signs, which use both visible light discharge from neon and other gases and phosphor excitation from ultraviolet light
Mercury vapor lamps
Mass spectrometers
Cathode ray tubes, employed in the oscilloscope and later in television sets, radar, and computer display devices
Electrotachyscope (an early moving picture display device)
Fluorescent lamps
Plasma globes

See also
William Crookes
Cathode ray tube
Crookes tube
Induction coil
Neon sign
Plasma globe
X-ray tube
German inventions and discoveries

References

External links
Sparkmuseum: Crookes and Geissler Tubes
Instruments for Natural Philosophy: Geissler Tubes
Mike's Electric Stuff: Geissler Tubes
The Cathode Ray Tube site
Geissler and Crookes tubes shown working
How to Make an Experimental Geissler Tube, Popular Science monthly, February 1919, Unnumbered page, Scanned by Google Books. 

Vacuum tube displays
Gas discharge lamps
German inventions